Azadieh Stadium, is a football stadium located in the Tehran, Iran. It is the home stadium of Iran women's national football team.

References

Football venues in Iran
Sports venues in Tehran